Tantamount to Treason Volume 1 (also known as simply Tantamount to Treason) is Michael Nesmith's fourth solo album during his post-Monkees career.  Released in 1972, Tantamount to Treason is the only album Michael Nesmith recorded and released with the Second National Band.  An assumed sequel (Tantamount to Treason Vol. 2) was said to have been recorded but was never released. Even so, Nesmith has personally stated that a follow up 'never happened and all rumors are false'.

The band on this release is credited as the Second National Band—the only remaining members from the original First National Band were Nesmith and O.J. "Red" Rhodes.  The Second National Band was filled out by Michael Cohen on keyboards (who had played on Nesmith's previous LP Nevada Fighter and on some of Nesmith's Monkees sessions), big-band drummer Jack Ranelli, bassist Johnny Meeks (who had played lead guitar years before with Gene Vincent), and Puerto Rican conga player Jose Feliciano.

The album is celebrated by Nesmith fans for its trippy, almost psychedelic feel. "Lazy Lady" has delay effects and white noise; "You Are My One" features guitar phasing and a long solo section; "In the Afternoon" and "Highway 99" include sound effects. Even the country music standard "She Thinks I Still Care" features a phased steel guitar solo. Nesmith also does his own version of Bill Chadwick's "Talking to the Wall"; Chadwick's own version was recorded under Nesmith's aegis in the late 1960s.

Tantamount to Treason was re-released in 2000 along with Nevada Fighter by RCA/BMG International in 2000. The re-release includes three previously unreleased bonus tracks.

Beer recipe
On the back cover of the LP, there is a recipe for the Papa Nes Home Brew.

Track listing
All songs by Michael Nesmith except where noted.
 "Mama Rocker" – 3:03
 "Lazy Lady" – 2:55
 "You Are My One" – 4:23
 "In the Afternoon" – 6:01
 "Highway 99 With Melange" (Michael Cohen) – 5:06
 "Wax Minute" (Richard Stekol) – 4:38
 "Bonaparte's Retreat" (Pee Wee King, Redd Stewart) – 4:36
 "Talking to the Wall" (Bill Chadwick) – 2:57
 "She Thinks I Still Care" (Dickey Lee, Steve Duffy) – 4:08

Personnel 
 Michael Nesmith - six and 12-string electric and acoustic guitars, vocals
 Michael Cohen - keyboards and Moog synthesizer
 Johnny Meeks - bass
 Jack Ranelli - drums
 Red Rhodes - pedal steel guitar
 José Feliciano - congas
Production notes
Produced by Michael Nesmith
Engineered by Peter Abbot
Art direction by Acy Lehman
Artwork by Wilson McLean
Design by Frank Mulvey

References

1972 albums
Michael Nesmith albums
RCA Records albums